Modernism Week is a 501(c)(3) organization which provides public education programming fostering knowledge and appreciation of modern architecture, the mid-century modern architecture and design movement, the Palm Springs School of Architecture, as well as contemporary considerations surrounding historic preservation, cultural heritage, adaptive reuse, and sustainable architecture. Modernism Week provides annual scholarships to local students pursuing college educations in the fields of architecture and design and supports local and state organizations' efforts to preserve and promote the region's modern architecture. The organization is centered in the greater Palm Springs, California area in the Coachella Valley which is home to a significant collection of extant residential and commercial buildings designed in the mid-century modern vernacular.

Description 
The primary event for the organization is an annual, eleven-day, region-wide advocacy and educational festival called “Modernism Week” which is held each February. Events are produced by Modernism Week and partner organizations and include symposia, films, lectures, tours, and a variety of opportunities to access architecturally significant buildings not otherwise available to the public. Educational programs explore the mid-century modern era as it applies to architecture, design, landscape, preservation, and culture. In addition to the primary event held each February, Modernism Week offers Modernism Week-October (previously called the “Fall Preview”), a four-day event held each October. This “mini-Modernism Week” was developed to provide additional educational opportunities to seasonal visitors.

History 
Modernism Week began in 2006 as an adjunct to two existing programs exploring mid-century architecture and design: the Palm Springs Modernism Show & Sale and the annual Palm Springs Art Museum Architecture & Design Council Symposium. The National Trust for Historic Preservation named Palm Springs, California to its 2006 list of America’s Dozen Distinctive Destinations, an annual list highlighting cultural tourism destinations for architecture. In 2009, Palm Springs was included on the List of Preserve America Communities and was welcomed to the program in a letter by then-First Lady Michelle Obama. In 2009, Modernism Week became a California 501(c)(3) non-profit organization. In 2015, a physical headquarters for the event was launched enabling visitors to gather at a central location throughout the festival. Dubbed, CAMP (Community And Meeting Place), this festival hub provides services and programs throughout the festival including serving as a depot for bus tours, educational programming, ticket sales, demonstrations, social events, and the distribution of general information.

Attendance
From 2012 to 2018, annual attendance increased from 12,000 to 125,000. The number of programmed events in 2018 was 350 with attendees representing the 50 United States and 19 countries. 
In 2019, attendance increased 20% over 2018 to an estimated 152,000 participating in over 370 events resulting in an estimated economic impact for the Coachella Valley of $57 million. International visitors from 25 countries participated alongside attendees from all 50 United States. California residents accounted for the majority of attendees (54 percent) representing 445 of 482 cities in California. 
In February 2020, attendance was estimated at 162,000 across 375 events resulting in an estimated economic impact of $61 million.  Attendees represented all 50 United States and 25 countries. In October 2020, the Fall Preview event, normally held in person, shifted to virtual programming in response to the COVID-19 pandemic. Virtual programs were created specifically for the event.  The 2021 Modernism Week festival was delayed from February to April allowing for a reduced program of in-person events aligning with relaxed County and State pandemic safety protocols.  This event drew an estimated 14,000 attendees participating in 30 events.  The 11-day festival generated an estimated economic impact of $5,250,000 for area hotels, shops, restaurants, and other businesses in the Coachella Valley despite the reduced program.

Notable speakers 
 Todd Oldham in 2015  and 2020 
 Martyn Lawrence Bullard  in 2018 
 Moshe Safdie in 2019 
 Daniel Libeskind in 2020 
 Jeanne Gang in 2022 
 Thom Mayne in 2023

Notable Palm Springs-region architects, designers, and developers of the era 

 Barry Berkus
 Buff, Smith and Hensman
 Richard Lee Dorman
 Richard Neutra
 John Lautner
 Donald Wexler
 Albert Frey
 William Krisel
 Paul Trousdale
 William Francis Cody
 John Porter Clark
 Howard Lapham
 Raymond Loewy
 Wallace Neff
 Alexander Construction Company
 E. Stewart Williams
 Lloyd Wright
 A. Quincy Jones
 William Haines
 Arthur Elrod
 Rudolph Schindler
 Paul Revere Williams
 Hugh M. Kaptur
 John Carl Warnecke
 Erle Webster and Adrian Wilson
 Walter S. White
 John Elgin Woolf
 William Pereira
 Victor Gruen
 Craig Ellwood

Gallery

External links 

 Official website

References 

Architecture festivals
Annual events in Riverside County, California
Buildings and structures in Palm Springs, California
Modernism